The Rio Grande Valley Livestock Show and Rodeo is an annual event in Mercedes, Texas. The show has been on for  years making this year's as year .

History
In 1939, the Rio Grande Valley Livestock Show and Agricultural Exposition, the forerunner of today's show, was organized as a project of the Mercedes Chamber of Commerce. The first Show was held in 1940 on the grounds of a local livestock sales yard with makeshift pens and lean-to sheds. The show continued to be held on this same property until 1949, when it moved to its present location at 1000 North Texas in Mercedes, with the exception of 1943 to 1945.

In 1947, the Show was incorporated and chartered as a nonprofit, educational organization with a Board of Directors representing all of the four southernmost counties in Texas. Up until 1955, all livestock was shown primarily in tents.

Volunteers from all walks of life (bankers, lawyers, accountants, farmers, and ranchers) and a dedicated Board of Directors, give endless hours of their time to make the show a success. Without them, it would be impossible to produce the show, as the costs would be excessive.  It is estimated that more than $25 million has been paid to FFA and 4-H exhibitors during the years the show has been in existence. The Rio Grande Valley Livestock Show has continued to grow each year, and now ranks as one of the top 10 in the state. People from all over Texas eagerly anticipate the event and come to enjoy the many activities, which include a parade, rodeo, carnival rides, competitive livestock events, and the many, many attractions that are scheduled daily.

2020 saw the Show go on despite the COVID-19 pandemic, though attendees did wear masks, as did all workers & performers.

References

http://texasfairs.com/

External links
Rio Grande Valley Livestock Show and Rodeo

Agricultural shows in the United States
Tourist attractions in Hidalgo County, Texas
Recurring events established in 1939
Rodeos
Festivals established in 1939